Basie Meets Bond is a 1966 album by Count Basie and his orchestra. The album is a collection of musical pieces originating from the first four James Bond films; Dr No, From Russia with Love, Goldfinger and Thunderball. The album was Basie's first for United Records, and was produced by Teddy Reig.

Reception

Ken Dryden, writing on AllMusic said of the album that "While it seems doubtful that Basie added any of this music to his regular band repertoire, his band does its best to do justice to the arrangements." Dryden praised Eddie "Lockjaw" Davis's solo on "Goldfinger" and Marshall Royal and Count Basie's solos on "Thunderball". Dryden conceded that the album could be "safely bypassed by most jazz fans" but said that Basie's fans might "find this surprising LP worth the investment".

Track listing

Personnel
The Count Basie Orchestra
Count Basie - piano
Al Aarons, Sonny Cohn, Wallace Davenport, Phil Guilbeau - trumpet
Henderson Chambers, Al Grey, Grover Mitchell - trombone
Bill Hughes - bass trombone
Marshal Royal - alto saxophone
Bobby Plater - alto saxophone, flute
Eric Dixon - tenor saxophone, flute
Eddie Lockjaw Davis - tenor saxophone
Charlie Fowlkes - baritone saxophone, bass clarinet
Freddie Green - guitar
Norman Keenan - bass guitar
Sonny Payne - drums
Chico O'Farrill, George Williams - arranger
Teddy Reig - producer

References

1966 albums
Albums arranged by Chico O'Farrill
Albums arranged by George Williams (musician)
Count Basie Orchestra albums
James Bond music
United Artists Records albums
Albums produced by Teddy Reig